"Shape of You" is a song by English singer-songwriter Ed Sheeran. It was released on 6 January 2017 as one of the double lead singles from his third studio album ÷ (2017), along with "Castle on the Hill". The dancehall and R&B-infused pop song was written by Ed Sheeran, Steve Mac and Johnny McDaid. Due to its interpolation of "No Scrubs" by TLC, Kandi Burruss, Tameka "Tiny" Cottle, and Kevin "She'kspere" Briggs are also credited as writers. The song was produced by Sheeran and Mac.

"Shape of You" peaked at number-one on the singles charts of 34 countries, including the US Billboard Hot 100 (later becoming the best performing song of 2017), as well as the UK, Australian and Canadian singles charts. It stayed at number one for a record-tying 16 consecutive weeks on the Canadian Hot 100, as well as 14 non-consecutive weeks on the UK Singles Chart, and 12 non-consecutive weeks on the Billboard Hot 100.

On 10 December 2018, the song became the first song to hit 2 billion streams on Spotify and is now the 2nd most streamed song on the platform with 3.3 billion streams, behind "Blinding Lights" by the Weeknd. It was also the most-streamed song of the decade on Spotify with 2.4 billion streams by December 2019. It was the best-selling song of 2017 and the decade in the UK. "Shape of You" was the best-selling song of 2017 and the second best-selling digital song worldwide, with combined sales and track-equivalent streams of 26.6 million units according to IFPI.

In 2018, it sold an additional 14.9 million copies, combining a total of 41.5 million copies worldwide with the previous total sales figure, making it one of the best selling digital singles of all time. Additionally, it made a second appearance in the Billboard year-end chart in 2018, at No. 71. In 2019, it was named the number-one song on the Billboard Mainstream Top 40 chart of the 2010s decade. "Shape of You" was nominated for British Single of the Year and  British Video of the Year at the 2018 Brit Awards. The song won the Grammy Award for Best Pop Solo Performance at the 60th Annual Grammy Awards. In 2021, Billboard ranked "Shape of You" as the tenth most successful song of all-time.

Background
The song was the last song written for Sheeran's third album ÷.  As he had recently written all the songs he wanted for the album, the song was therefore not intended to be included in the album.  It was conceived as a duet between Rihanna and Rudimental, but the head of the record label convinced him to keep the song for himself. He said:
 "['Shape of You'] is actually a really random one because I went in to write songs for other people with a guy called Steve Mac and Johnny McDaid, and we were writing this song and I was like 'this would really work for Rihanna,'" he explained. "And then I started singing lyrics like 'putting Van the Man on the jukebox' and I was like 'well she's not really going to sing that, is she?' And then we sort of decided halfway through that we were just going to make it for me."

According to Sheeran, Steve Mac started the songwriting session by playing the opening notes of the song on the keyboard.  Sheeran then joined in, adding percussion by tapping on the guitar, layering it onto the track.  On the writing of the song, he said that he tried to keep the music "more stripped" instead of something more elaborate: "I'm an acoustic artist, first and foremost. And when I play live, I can't replicate these things, I haven't got all the other musicians." Sheeran said he wanted an R&B feel to the song, therefore he adjusted the original tune, adding an interpolation of "No Scrubs" onto part of the melody. He also revealed that the original lyrics did not end with the words "the shape of you" in the chorus, but during the writing of the song,  McDaid thought that the lyrics "I'm in love with your body" sounded objectifying, and the lyrics was therefore adjusted.

Release
On 6 January 2017, when hosting The Radio 1 Breakfast Show, Sheeran revealed that "Shape of You" was written with Rihanna in mind.  On 4 January 2017, Sheeran uploaded a six-second teaser video of a blue background to social media, with lyrics "the club isn't the best place to find a lover", which is the first line of "Shape of You". To further tease the release, Sheeran and his label used a sponsored Snapchat lens filter with 30 seconds of the song to increase buzz among the general public.

Composition

"Shape of You" is a pop, and dancehall song with "strummy acoustics." In the song, Sheeran sings over a marimba-fueled percussive sway about a budding romance. "The club isn't the best place to find a lover, so the bar is where I go/ Me and my friends at the table doing shots drinking fast and then we talk slow", he sings. "Come over and start up a conversation with just me/ And trust me I'll give it a chance." According to NT News, the song "tells the story of loved (or lusted) up Sheeran meeting a girl in a bar where he and his mates are doing shots." "Shape of You" is written in the key of C minor with a tempo of 96 beats per minute. The song is composed in common time ( time), and follows a basic chord progression of Cm–Fm–A–B (i–iv–VI–VII), and Sheeran's vocals span from G3 to G5. It has a tresillo rhythm.

The song's lyrical rhythm drew some comparisons to the TLC song "No Scrubs", particularly in the pre-chorus line, "Boy, let's not talk too much/ Grab on my waist and put that body on me". Kandi Burruss had told Bravo’s Andy Cohen that the negotiations had started before the song's release for its interpolation but weren't finalized until afterwards. As a result, the composers of "No Scrubs", Kandi Burruss, Tameka "Tiny" Cottle, and Kevin "She'kspere" Briggs, received co-writing credits on "Shape of You".

Critical reception
Jon Caramanica from The New York Times said, "'Shape of You' is trickier, a nimble and effective song that takes the aggressive thinning of 'Caribbean music'." Billboards Taylor Weatherby wrote about the song saying, "'Shape of You' doesn't quite sound like your typical Sheeran tune. But that almost serves as an indication of what the "Thinking Out Loud" singer has been up to during his hiatus: creating music that still feels like Sheeran, just with a new twist." Jeremy Gordon of Spin gave the song a positive review, stating that the song "is a plausible attempt at convincing us he has had sex ... a lot of it. It kind of slaps, though you can't really picture Sheeran ever saying 'put that body on me' to a real human woman."

Commercial performance
"Shape of You" debuted at number one on the UK Singles Chart on 13 January 2017, selling 227,000 combined units in its first week and becoming Sheeran's third UK number one. Sheeran also debuted at number two with the song "Castle on the Hill", making him the first artist in UK chart history to debut in the top two positions simultaneously. It spent 13 consecutive weeks at number one, and a further week at the top after a week's interruption by Harry Styles' "Sign of the Times". In July 2017, the song reached 184 million in streams, making it the most-streamed song in the UK of all time. It was the nation's highest selling and most streamed track of 2017 with 787,000 copies sold and 248 million streams throughout the year, to produce a combined sales of 3.2 million. In September 2020, the track was certified eight-times platinum by the British Phonographic Industry (BPI). "Shape of You" is Sheeran's best-selling single in the UK with total sales of 5.09 million units as of July 2021, according to the Official Charts Company.

The song debuted at number one on the Billboard Hot 100, selling 240,000 downloads and gaining 20 million streams in its debut week in the US, becoming Sheeran's first number one song in the country. Sheeran also became the first artist to debut two songs in the top 10 the same week in the history of the Hot 100, with "Castle on the Hill" also debuting at number six. "Shape of You" topped the Hot 100 for 12 non-consecutive weeks. In its fourth week at number one, the song also topped the Mainstream Top 40, becoming Sheeran's second number-one single on the chart (after 2015's "Thinking Out Loud"). On 6 May 2017, it fell to number two on the Hot 100, being displaced by Kendrick Lamar's "Humble".  On the issue date, 2 September 2017, "Shape of You" spent its 32nd week in the top ten of Hot 100, tying the record for the most weeks on that chart with LeAnn Rimes' "How Do I Live" and the Chainsmokers' "Closer" featuring Halsey. The following week, "Shape of You" spent its 33rd consecutive week in the top 10, breaking the 20-year-old record. This record would be tied twice and eventually broken in 2020 by Post Malone's "Circles." On Billboards Dance/Mix Show Airplay chart, "Shape of You" became Sheeran's first number one on a Dance/EDM chart (his third top ten and sixth overall at Dance/Mix Show Airplay) in the United States. Afterwards, the song topped Dance Club Songs in its 18 March 2017 issue, his first as a solo artist and his second entry on this chart, when he was a featured artist on Rudimental's "Lay It All on Me", which peaked at No. 38 in 2016.  By August 2017, "Shape of You" was the best selling song of 2017 in the US with 2.3 million copies sold, the only one to sell over two million. It is also the most streamed song with 799.7 million combined audio and video streams.  The song became the number one song of the year on Billboard Hot 100 in 2017, and the second best-selling song in the US after "Despacito" with over 2.5 million copies sold.

It debuted at number one in France, and was later certified diamond there. According to Pure Charts, in the first half of the year 2017, the song reached 631,000 units (105,000 sales and 526,000 units from streams) and as of September 2017, it exceeds 812,109 units (707,109 from streams). It was the best-selling song (including streaming) in France this year. In Australia, the song stayed at No. 1 for 15 weeks, breaking a record set 22 years ago by Coolio's "Gangsta's Paradise". In doing this, it also broke ABBA's record of fourteen weeks at number one, which was set on the previous Australian charts before the ARIA charts became Australia's official charts. "Shape of You" was also Australia's highest selling song of 2017 with 630,000 copies sold by the end of the year. The song is the first ever number one single of the now-defunct Philippine Hot 100 upon the chart's inception on 12 June 2017. It stayed at the peak position for 4 consecutive weeks before it was dethroned by "Despacito" by Luis Fonsi and Daddy Yankee featuring Justin Bieber.

Worldwide, the song reached one billion streams on Spotify in June 2017. It became the most streamed song on Spotify in September 2017, reaching 1,318,420,396 streams overtaking Drake's "One Dance". It became the first song to reach 2 billions in streams on Spotify in 2018, and it was the most-streamed song of the decade on Spotify, with 2.4 billion streams in the 2010s. On 22 December 2021, "Shape of You" became Spotify's first song to hit 3 billion streams.

In August 2018, Billboard published a new edition of the "Greatest of All Time Hot 100 Singles" chart, its list of the 100 best-performing songs in the history of the Hot 100. "Shape of You" was ranked at number nine, the third-highest position of any song released in the 2010s (behind only "Uptown Funk" by Mark Ronson featuring Bruno Mars and "Party Rock Anthem" by LMFAO featuring Lauren Bennett and GoonRock).

On November 23, 2021, Billboard published an updated edition of the "Greatest of All Time Hot 100 Singles" chart from 2018 where "Shape of You" is currently ranked the #10 Greatest Hot 100 Hit of All Time following the induction of The Weeknd's 2019 single "Blinding Lights" which currently holds the #1 position.

Copyright trial
In March 2022, Sheeran was taken to court by musicians Sami Chokri and Ross O'Donoghue who allege "Shape of You" infringes "particular lines and phrases" of their 2015 composition "Oh Why". Sheeran and his co-writers, Steven McCutcheon and John McDaid, have been barred by music licensing body PRS for Music from collecting an estimated £20m in royalties from the performances or broadcasts of "Shape of You". Legal proceedings began in May 2018, with Sheeran and his co-writers asking the high court to declare they had not infringed Chokri and O'Donoghue's copyright. Two months later, Chokri and O'Donoghue issued their own claim for "copyright infringement, damages and an account of profits in relation to the alleged infringement".

On 6 April 2022, the judge ruled that Sheeran had "neither deliberately nor subconsciously copied" Chokri's song. While there were "similarities between the one-bar phrase", the judge said that "differences between the relevant parts" of the songs were "compelling evidence that the 'Oh I' phrase" in Sheeran's song "originated from sources other than Oh Why".  After the win, Sheeran said: "I feel like claims like this are way too common now and have become a culture where a claim is made with the idea that a settlement will be cheaper than taking it to court, even if there's no basis for the claim. It's really damaging to the songwriting industry. There's only so many notes and very few chords used in pop music. Coincidence is bound to happen if 60,000 songs are being released every day on Spotify. That's 22 million songs a year, and there's only 12 notes that are available."

Lyric video
On 5 January 2017, to accompany the song's release, a lyric video for "Shape of You" was released on Sheeran's YouTube channel with "Castle on the Hill". As of April 2022, the official lyric video has had 915 million views on YouTube.

Music video

Release
On 30 January 2017, the official music video of the song, starring US dancer and model Jennie Pegouskie and retired professional sumo wrestler Yamamotoyama Ryūta (credited as "Yama"), was released on Sheeran's channel. It was shot in Seattle, and was directed by Jason Koenig who also directed Sheeran's fourth single "Perfect" from his studio album "÷".

Synopsis
The music video opens with Ed Sheeran who is first seen sitting down in a lonely dark room save for the sunlight that shines beside him with footages featuring his love interest and fellow boxer (Jennie Pegouskie) and his upcoming match. As the song begins, we see Sheeran shadowboxing while Pegouskie is already at the gym ready for the workout. She hangs herself at the punching bag doing sit-up and stretches herself. A little while later, Pegouskie shadowboxes and punches a punching bag when Sheeran lately arrives at the training carrying a bag with him. After Sheeran places his bag at the closet, he proceeds to train himself for his upcoming match trained by a personal trainer along with Pegouskie who still warms up herself. Later, Sheeran and Pegouskie head out of the gym towards a restaurant while bonding each other. Upon arriving, the couple eat and shared foods like canoodling over a fried chicken as they have an intimate conversation with each other, although their dialogue is entirely mute. Afterwards, Sheeran and his girlfriend ride a taxi and make out at the back seat while the taxi driver does not notice this as he is focusing on driving. Back at the gym, Sheeran and Pegouskie physically trained hard doing various training exercises. While training, the couple embraced each other and teach one other, eventually falling in love with each other in the process. Later, Pegouskie leaves a picture and a box to Sheeran in a closet and seemingly abandons him. The scene cuts back to Sheeran who discovers a picture and a black box both seen earlier with the latter containing a blue mouthguard featuring a "÷" symbol at the front. Realizing that his girlfriend had left him (unbeknownst to him, she already is at a passenger ship), He starts to search for her to no avail. In response to her disappointing departure, Sheeran lets out his frustration and proceeds to an intense workout that includes tire-flipping, shadowboxing, sit-up, running and push-up. Later, Sheeran participates a match he has anticipated throughout the clip but he unexpectedly encounters a Rikishi or a sumo wrestler (Yamamotoyama Ryūta), much to his shock. During the match, Sheeran is seen almost always avoiding Yama who constantly chases him and the latter fails to defeat the Rikishi. Sheeran ends up getting defeated and is thrown at the edge of the ring crying in agony with the crowd encouraging him to stand up. Towards the end of the video, Yama wins the match but Pegouskie emerges the scene among the crowd flying into the ring with a karate kick in the air aiming towards Yama as the scene cuts to black with the text that reads “DIRECTED BY: JASON KOENIG”. Sheeran is last seen at the end of the music video struggling to get up while lying down on the floor but he fails to do so.

Reception
On 8 May 2017, 97 days after its release, it became one of the fastest music videos to reach 1 billion views on YouTube, and as of May 2022, the music video has over 5.7 billion views on the site and is the site's fifth most-watched video as well as the second most-watched music video.

Live performances
Sheeran performed "Shape of You" on Saturday Night Live on 11 February 2017 and at the 59th Annual Grammy Awards the following day. On 27 February, Sheeran performed the song on The Tonight Show Starring Jimmy Fallon, with Fallon and The Roots, who used classroom instruments. On 6 July, Sheeran performed the track on US breakfast television show Today. On 27 August, Sheeran performed "Shape of You" at 2017 MTV Video Music Awards in a medley with Lil Uzi Vert and his song "XO Tour Llif3". At the NRJ Music Awards 2017 on 4 November, he performed "Shape of You" in a medley with Soprano and  his song "Fresh Prince".

Remixes and covers
The official remix of "Shape of You" features newly additional verses and guest vocals by English grime artist Stormzy. The remix premiered during Sheeran and Stormzy's live collaboration at the 2017 Brit Awards at The O2 in London on 22 February 2017.

Sheeran announced on Twitter that the remix would be released officially on 24 February 2017. On the same date, various remixes of the song were released on digital music services. Sheeran teased the releases ahead of 2017 Brit Awards ceremony. "I've got two things dropping on Friday that are pretty interesting", he revealed in a BBC Radio 1 interview just hours before the big show. "One that gets debuted at the Brits, which I think people will go a bit nuts for." He added, "It's something that I think nobody is expecting. I think it'll be decent."

Major Lazer released his own remix entitled "Shape of You (Major Lazer Remix)" on 27 February 2017. It featured vocals by the Jamaican singer Nyla and the Jamaican reggae and dancehall artist Kranium.

In the United States, "Shape of You" has immediately become a favourite among DJs and remixers, prompting several of them to create their own versions. One DJ, Joe "Maz" Masurka, told Billboard that after he did his own remix on the single that he received a lot of great feedback and response: "... the dance floor loves it."

In September 2018, Ndlovu Youth Choir and Wouter Kellerman released "Shape of You" in Zulu version.

In other media
In March 2017, a Walsall woman Sonia Bryce was imprisoned for two months for noise pollution after repeatedly playing "Shape of You" at a high volume. English singer Charli XCX performed "Shape of You" in drag as Sheeran on the US television series Lip Sync Battle in March 2018. The song is featured on the dance rhythm game, Just Dance 2018. It was featured and remixed in YouTube Rewind: The Shape of 2017. The song is also used in an episode in the French version of Skam. Pentatonix covered the song as a mash-up with "Despacito" for their 2018 album PTX Presents: Top Pop, Vol. I. Likewise, the song was covered by Hawaiian ukulele artist Jake Shimabukuro for his 2018 album, The Greatest Day. The song appears often in the Japanese drama 僕たちがやりました(We Did It/Fugitive Boys). M&S used the song in their food adverts from 2017 to 2019. It also serves as the singer (Sheeran's) ringtone in Yesterday.

The song also has been covered by Postmodern Jukebox, done as a Stevie Wonder-style 1970s number, guest starring Stefano Langone on lead vocals. The video amassed three million views. "Shape of You" has also been referenced in Doja Cat's "Get Into It (Yuh)", from the album Planet Her (2021).

Formats and track listings
Digital download and streaming
"Shape of You" – 3:53

Digital download and streaming – Galantis Remix
"Shape of You" (Galantis Remix) – 3:15

Digital download and streaming – Acoustic
"Shape of You" (Acoustic) – 3:43

Digital download and streaming – Stormzy Remix
"Shape of You" (Stormzy Remix) – 3:51

Digital download and streaming – Major Lazer Remix
"Shape of You" (featuring Nyla and Kramium) [Major Lazer Remix] – 3:12

Digital download and streaming – Latin Remix
"Shape of You" (featuring Zion & Lennox) [Latin Remix] – 3:57

Digital download and streaming – Yxng Bane Remix
"Shape of You" (Yxng Bane Remix) – 4:25

Digital download and streaming – NOTD Remix
"Shape of You" (NOTD Remix) – 3:10

CD single
"Shape of You" – 3:53
"Shape of You" (Acoustic) – 3:43

Credits and personnel
Credits and personnel adapted from ÷ album liner notes.

Recording
Recorded at Rokstone Studios (London) and Gingerbread Man Studios (Suffolk and London)
Mixed at The Mixsuite (South London and Los Angeles)
Mastered at Metropolis Mastering (London)

Personnel

Ed Sheeran – songwriter, lead vocals, background vocals, co-producer, percussion
Johnny McDaid – songwriter, guitars
Steve Mac – songwriter, producer, keyboards
Kandi Burruss – songwriter
Kevin "She'kspere" Briggs – songwriter
Tameka Cottle – songwriter
Dann Pursey – engineering
Chris Laws – engineering, drums
Joe Rubel – engineering
Mark "Spike" Stent – mixing
Geoff Swan – mixing assistant
Michael Freeman – mixing assistant
Wayne Hernandez – background vocals
Travis Cole – background vocals
Geo Gabriel – background vocals
Stuart Hawkes – mastering

Charts

Weekly charts

Monthly charts

Year-end charts

Decade-end charts

All-time charts

Certifications and sales

Release history

See also

List of best-selling singles

References

External links
 
 
 
 
 
 

2017 singles
2016 songs
Ed Sheeran songs
Number-one singles in Australia
Number-one singles in Austria
Billboard Hot 100 number-one singles
Canadian Hot 100 number-one singles
Dutch Top 40 number-one singles
Irish Singles Chart number-one singles
Number-one singles in Denmark
Number-one singles in Finland
Number-one singles in France
Number-one singles in Germany
Number-one singles in Greece
Number-one singles in Hungary
Number-one singles in Israel
Number-one singles in Italy
Number-one singles in Malaysia
Number-one singles in Norway
Number-one singles in Poland
Number-one singles in Portugal
Number-one singles in Romania
Number-one singles in Russia
Number-one singles in Scotland
Number-one singles in Sweden
Number-one singles in Switzerland
British dancehall songs
UK Singles Chart number-one singles
Ultratop 50 Singles (Flanders) number-one singles
Ultratop 50 Singles (Wallonia) number-one singles
Reggae fusion songs
Song recordings produced by Steve Mac
Songs written by Ed Sheeran
Songs written by Johnny McDaid
Songs written by Steve Mac
Grammy Award for Best Pop Solo Performance
Songs written by Tameka Cottle
Tropical house songs
Songs written by Kevin "She'kspere" Briggs
Songs written by Kandi Burruss
Songs involved in plagiarism controversies
Asylum Records singles
Atlantic Records singles
Songs about casual sex